A bumper fracture is a fracture of the lateral tibial plateau caused by the bumper of a car coming into contact with the outer side of the knee when a person is standing.
Specifically, it is caused by a forced valgus applied to the knee. This causes the lateral part of the distal femur and the lateral tibial plateau to come into contact, compressing the tibial plateau and causing the tibia to fracture. The name of the injury is because it was described as being caused by the impact of a car bumper on the lateral side of the knee while the foot is planted on the ground, although this mechanism is only seen in about 25% of tibial plateau fractures.

Fracture of the neck of the fibula may also be found, and associated injury to the medial collateral ligament or cruciate ligaments occurs in about 10% of cases.

History 
The term "bumper fracture" was coined in 1929 by Cotton and Berg.

References

External links

Bone fractures